Reidmorania occidentalis is a succulent plant in the stonecrop family (Crassulaceae) native to the state of Sinaloa in Mexico. It is within the monotypic genus Reidmorania, which is named after botanist Reid Moran, who was notable for his research in the Crassulaceae family.

Description

Morphology 
The plant grows in a caespitose habit, with short stems and rosettes around 4.5 cm wide. The leaves are oblanceolate and obtuse, mucronate, glabrous, and bluish green to green. The inflorescence is paniculate, with floral stems 11 to 36 cm long, bearing 3 to 10 flowers. The sepals are ascending, adpressed, ovate, and are colored olive-green, with the corolla tubular-campanulate, 6 to 7 mm long, 4 mm wide at the base, and 7 mm wide at the mouth. The petals are ascending, imbricate, and oblanceolate, keeled, and with three to five faint reddish longitudinal veins, the central darkest, and merging with the cuspidate reddish apex.

Taxonomy

Taxonomic history 
The plant was discovered to science in Sinaloa by a collector J. G. Ortega in 1920. This plant was originally placed as Graptopetalum occidentale, described by Joseph Nelson Rose and Eric Walther in 1933 from the single collection. Echeveria kimnachii was also described later in 1998 by Jorge Meyrán and Rito Vega, named after botanist Myron Kimnach. It was placed in the series Paniculatae, compared with Echeveria amoena and Echeveria microcalyx. Kimnach himself realized the species was synonymous with Graptopetalum occidentale, but noticed that the species did not fit into Graptopetalum, and thus was moved into the new genus Reidmorania, named after Kimnach's late colleague Reid Moran.

Distribution and habitat 
This plant is found in the Culiacan municipality in Sinaloa. It is commonly found in a limited area near the Sierra Tacuichamona. In habitat, It occurs in tropical sub-deciduous forest, associated with Agave, Brosimum, Bursera and Hechtia.

References 

Crassulaceae
Crassulaceae genera
Flora of Sinaloa
Monotypic Saxifragales genera